Silver exchange-traded products are exchange-traded funds (ETFs), exchange-traded notes (ETNs) and closed-end funds (CEFs) that aim to track the price of silver. Silver exchange-traded products are traded on the major stock exchanges including the London and New York Stock Exchanges. The U.S Geological Survey cites the emergence of silver ETFs as a significant factor in the 2007-2011 price rise of silver. As of September 2011, the largest of these funds holds the equivalent of over one third of the world's total annual silver production.

Products

Physically backed funds
 Central Fund of Canada and Silver Bullion Trust are closed-end funds created by the same Canadian founders and mandated to keep the bulk of their net assets in precious metals, with a small percentage of cash. The Central Fund of Canada holds a mix of gold and silver, while the Silver Bullion Trust holds only silver. The Central Fund of Canada and Silver Bullion Trust initial public offerings were completed in 1961 and 2009 respectively.
 iShares Silver Trust was launched by iShares in April 2006. As of November 2010, iShares Silver Trust is the largest silver ETF on the market with over 335 million troy ounces of silver in storage.
 ETFS Physical Silver was launched by ETF Securities in April 2007 and is backed by allocated silver bullion. ETF Securities have since launched physical silver ETFs on multiple exchanges around the world including Paris, Australia, New York and Tokyo. ETFS Physical Silver is backed by allocated bullion in the form of LBMA bars held with a custodian, HSBC Bank USA, and audited twice a year by an independent third party, Inspectorate International Ltd.
 ZKB Silver ETF was launched by Zürcher Kantonalbank in May 2007 and invests exclusively in physical silver.
 Claymore Silver Bullion Trust is a closed-end fund created by Claymore Investments. The initial public offering was completed on July 15, 2009.
 Julius Baer Physical Silver Fund was launched by Swiss & Global Asset Management (formerly Julius Baer Asset Management) in January 2010.
 Sprott Physical Silver Trust is a closed-end fund created by Sprott Asset Management. The initial public offering was completed on November 3, 2010.

Other products
 db Physical Silver ETC was launched by Deutsche Bank in July 2010.

See also
 Gold exchange-traded product
 Platinum as an investment
 Silver as an investment

References

Commodities used as an investment
Exchange-traded products